Rubus leucodermis, also called whitebark raspberry or blackcap raspberry, is a species of Rubus native to western North America.

Description
While the crown is perennial, the canes are biennial, growing vegetatively one year, flowering and fruiting the second, and then dying. As with other dark raspberries, the tips of the first-year canes (primocanes) often grow downward to the soil in the fall, and take root and form tip layers which become new plants. The leaves are pinnate, with five leaflets on the leaves' hardy stems in their first year, and three leaflets on leaves on flowering branchlets with white (and infrequently light purple) flowers.

The fruit is  diameter, red to reddish-purple at first, turning dark purple to nearly black when ripe. The edible fruit has high contents of anthocyanins and ellagic acid.

R. leucodermis is similar to the eastern black raspberry (Rubus occidentalis).

Taxonomy

Subdivision 
Three varieties are recognized:
Rubus leucodermis var. leucodermis – Alaska to Chihuahua
Rubus leucodermis var. bernardinus Jepson – southern California
Rubus leucodermis var. trinitatis Berger – southern California

Etymology 
The name leucodermis means "white skin", referring to the white appearance of the stems because of a thick waxy coating on the surface.

Distribution and habitat 
The species can be found from Alaska southward along the Pacific coast as far as California, Arizona, New Mexico, and Chihuahua.

Ecology 
The plant forms natural hybrids with other species in subgenus Idaeobatus.

See also 
Rubus coreanus
Rubus niveus

References

External links 
 
 
 UC Photos gallery: Rubus leucodermis

leucodermis
Berries
Flora of Alaska
Flora of British Columbia
Flora of California
Flora of New Mexico
Flora of Northwestern Mexico
Flora of the Cascade Range
Flora of the Northwestern United States
Flora of the Sierra Nevada (United States)
Flora of the Southwestern United States
Garden plants of North America
Natural history of the California Coast Ranges
Natural history of the Transverse Ranges
Plants described in 1840
Flora without expected TNC conservation status